The Microporellidae is a family within the bryozoan order Cheilostomatida.

Classification 

Family Microporellidae
 Genus Adelascopora
 Genus Calloporina
 Genus Chronocerastes
 Genus Cribriporella
 Genus Diporula
 Genus Fenestruloides
 Genus Flustramorpha
 Genus Microporella
 Genus Microporelloides
 Genus Pseudoadelascopora
 Genus Tenthrenulina

References 

Bryozoan families
Cheilostomatida
Extant Miocene first appearances